Enterrium (formerly known as Level 257 then Pac-Man Entertainment) is a contemporary American restaurant and video arcade located at Woodfield Mall in Schaumburg, Illinois. The restaurant and entertainment destination was originally inspired by Pac-Man and the name refers to the famous kill screen, which occurs when the player reaches the 256th level of the original Pac-Man game, meaning "the next level of dining and entertainment". It was owned by Bandai Namco Entertainment from 2015 to 2021, which also owns all Pac-Man-related intellectual property. The restaurant celebrated its soft opening on March 2, 2015, and its grand opening in April 2015.

In March 2021, the location was sold to National Entertainment Network and was rebranded as the Enterrium.

Style 
It sits on 42,000 square feet which was previously used as a warehouse for a Sears department store. In addition, the restaurant also features sixteen boutique bowling lanes, table tennis and social sports, as well as video and board games in the Lost & Found Game Lounge. The interior decor is up-scale modern urban-chic in style and includes levels of references to the video game character Pac-Man. The menu also features references to well-known video game terms of the 1980s, such as "1-UP", chocolate "power pellets", and "Game Over".

History 

The restaurant was first conceived as a prototype in 2013, when Namco announced that the restaurant (codenamed Level 256 at the time) was being developed in partnership with a restaurateur in Kansas City, saying that were eyeing the Chicago area for possible locations. The restaurant celebrated its soft opening on March 2, 2015.

In March 2021, Pac-Man Entertainment was sold to National Entertainment Network following Bandai Namco's decision to withdraw amusement facility business in North America, citing the COVID-19 pandemic heavily impacting their business. Pac-Man Entertainment would be rebranded as the Enterrium, stripping the location of its Pac-Man theme.

Events 

The restaurant celebrated the 35th anniversary of Pac-Man on Friday, May 22, 2015. It featured a live performance of "Pac-Man Fever" by Jerry Buckner of Buckner & Garcia.

References

External links 

 

Former Bandai Namco Holdings subsidiaries
Pac-Man
Restaurants in Illinois
Restaurants established in 2015
2015 establishments in Illinois
Theme restaurants
Video arcades
Buildings and structures in Cook County, Illinois